The Church of Ireland Gazette is a monthly magazine promoting the Christian faith, covers the activities of the Church of Ireland across all its dioceses in Ireland (North and South). Although associated with the Church of Ireland (Anglican) the Gazettes editorial is formally Independent. Published in Lisburn, County Antrim, the magazine distributes about 5,000 copies monthly. It is published on the second Friday of each month.

Established and first published in March 1856 by the Church of Ireland, as a monthly journal under the title, The Irish Ecclesiastical Gazette (The Church of England's paper was called The Ecclesiastical Gazette), the Gazette became weekly in 1880. Its name was changed to The Church of Ireland Gazette in 1900. The publication reverted to a colour monthly magazine format in January 2019.  The Gazette was published from 61 Middle Abbey Street, Dublin, (where James Charles & Sons Printers, were based, until 1897 when a new company was formed Church of Ireland Printing and Publishing Ltd. ) up until the 1960s, while it survived the rising in 1916 it was unable to publish that week, and had a joint week the week after.
Irish Church Directory / The Church of Ireland Directory was also published from the middle abbey street office from 1862 until 1966 when it moved to Mark Street, in Dublin.

Editors
Karen Bushby became the first female editor of the Gazette in June 2019. She replaced the Revd. Earl Storey who was Editor from May 2017 to June 2019.
Previous editors of the paper included Revd. Canon Ian Ellis (2001 to May 2017), Canon Cecil Cooper (1982-2001),  Bishop William Gilbert Wilson (1963-1966) and Rev. Houston McKelvey(1975-1982). The longest-serving Irish Times Editor John Edward Healy served as editor of the Gazette for a time as did Warre Bradley Wells (1906-1918) who served as editor during the 1916 Rising when the Gazette was based in Middle Abbey Street, Dublin, also wrote the weekly column entitled The War Week by Week during the First World War.  Rev. James Anderson Carr was editor from 1871 until 1893, Canon Courtenay Moore M.A., V.P.R.S.A.I. edited it from 1893 to 1897 and was succeeded by Canon Charles Irvine Graham who served until 1905. 

Emma Blain was appointed editor in September 2020.

 Rev. James Anderson Carr (1871-1893)
 Canon Courtenay Moore (1893-1897)
 Canon Charles Irvine Graham (1897-1905)
 Rev. Warre B. Wells (1906-1918)
 Rev. George Ashton Chamberlain (1919-1924)
 Canon Hugh W. B. Thompson (1924-1930)
 Canon Ernest William Greening (1934-1954)
 Canon Frederick Andrew Graves (Andy) Willis (1959-1975)
 Rev. Gilbert Wilson (1963-1966) - jointly with Canon Andy Willis
 Rev. Houston McKelvey(1975-1982)
 Canon Cecil Cooper (1982-2001)
 Canon Ian Ellis (2001-2017)
 Karen Bushby (2019-2020)
 Emma Blain (2020-present)

Contributors
First woman mayor of limerick Frances Condell contributed to the gazette.

Archive
A full archive of back copies is held at the Church of Ireland's Library at Braemor Park, Dublin. Its website is hosted on the Irish Anglican website, and much of the archive is available online.
On the April 2nd, 2017 it was announced further funding to digitise all issues from 1856 managed by the Representative Church Body Library. On 2 January 2018 all issues to 1923 were published online as part of the Decade of Commemorations.

References

External links
 
 The Church of Ireland Gazette 1856 – 1923 archives

Other Church of Ireland Publications
 The Irish Church Advocate, founded 1836
 Achill Missionary Herald and Western Witness (1837-1869)
 Braemor Studies, Church of Ireland Theological Institute, published by Church of Ireland Publishing.

Church of Ireland
Newspapers published in Ireland
Publications established in 1856